James Herman De Ricci (15 March 1847 – 1900)  was Attorney General of Fiji from 1875 to 1876. He is remembered, among other things, as the author of Fiji (Our New Province in the South Seas).

The son of Herman Robert De Ricci, he was married to Hélène Levi Montefiore (1857-1932), daughter of Edouard Levi Montefiore and Emma Cahen d'Anvers. They had a son, Seymour Montefiore Roberto Rosso, and a daughter, Alice.

References 

Attorneys General of the Colony of Fiji
Attorneys-general of Fiji
1847 births
1900 deaths
Ethnic minority Fijian politicians